Co-op Academy Stoke-on-Trent is a mixed secondary school located in the Tunstall area of Stoke-on-Trent in the English county of Staffordshire.

Previously known as Brownhills High School, the school was awarded specialist status as a Maths and Computing College and was renamed Brownhills Maths and Computing College. In September 2010 the school converted to academy status and was renamed The Co-operative Academy of Stoke-on-Trent (later Co-op Academy Stoke-on-Trent). The school is now part of The Co-operative Academies Trust - a group of schools sponsored by The Co-operative Group. In September 2012 the school relocated to new buildings.

References

External links
Co-op Academy Stoke-on-Trent official website

Secondary schools in Stoke-on-Trent
Academies in Stoke-on-Trent